University of Exeter Press (UEP) is the academic press of the University of Exeter, England.

In 2013, Liverpool University Press acquired the rights to UEP's publications on archaeology, medieval studies, history, classics and ancient history, landscape studies.

Main subject areas

 Arabic and Islamic Studies
 Archaeology
 Celtic Studies
 Classical Studies and Ancient History
 Cultural and Social Studies
 Education
 English and American Literature
 European Literature
 Exeter Hispanic Textes
 Exeter Textes Littéraires
 Film History
 History
 Landscape Studies
 Linguistics and Lexicography
 Maritime Studies
 Medieval Studies
 Mining History
 Nazism
 Performance
 Philosophy and Religion
 South-West Studies

References

External links
 Official Website of the University of Exeter Press

Press
Exeter, University of
Publishing companies of the United Kingdom